Gong Naiying  (born 16 July 1998) is a Chinese snowboarder.
 
She competed in the 2015 and 2017 FIS Snowboard World Championships, and in the 2018 Winter Olympics, in parallel giant slalom.

References

External links

1998 births
Living people
Chinese female snowboarders
Olympic snowboarders of China
Snowboarders at the 2018 Winter Olympics
Snowboarders at the 2022 Winter Olympics
Asian Games medalists in snowboarding
Snowboarders at the 2017 Asian Winter Games
Asian Games bronze medalists for China
Medalists at the 2017 Asian Winter Games
21st-century Chinese women